The Battle of Cuddalore was a naval battle between a British fleet, under Admiral Sir Edward Hughes with Admiral L.J. Weiland, and a smaller French fleet, under the Bailli de Suffren, off the coast of India during the American Revolutionary War. This war sparked the Second Mysore War in India. In the battle, taking place near Cuddalore on 20 June 1783, Suffren commanded the engagement from the frigate Cléopâtre and won what is generally considered a victory. Peace had already been agreed upon in Europe, but that news had yet to reach India, making this the final battle of the war.

On the death of French ally Hyder Ali, the British decided to retake Cuddalore. They marched troops from Madras, and began preparing for a siege. The French fleet, under Suffren, appeared at Cuddalore on 13 June. A week of fickle winds prevented either side from engaging until 20 June, when Suffren attacked. No ships were seriously damaged, but each side lost about 100 men with around 400 wounded. The British fleet retreated to Madras after the action, preventing the landing of transports carrying additional troops en route to Cuddalore to reinforce the siege. A sortie from the town weakened the British forces, and word of peace officially arrived at Cuddalore on 29 June.

Background
Following the December 1782 death of French ally Hyder Ali, the ruler of Mysore and previous controller of Cuddalore, British commanders at Madras decided to attempt the recapture of Cuddalore. The army marched south from Madras, circling around the city then encamping south of it. The British fleet, eighteen ships of the line under Admiral Sir Edward Hughes, anchored to the south of Cuddalore in order to protect the army and its supply ships. By early June 1783, the Siege of Cuddalore was under way.

French Admiral Suffren was ordered on 10 June to sail with his smaller fleet of fifteen ships from Trincomalee to support the besieged city. When he arrived, Hughes, who sought to avoid battle, moved away from the city and again anchored. After five days of adverse winds, Suffren was able to anchor near the city, where he made contact with the city's commander, Sayed Sahib of Mysore. Since it appeared that the success of the siege would be decided by naval action, 1,200 troops were embarked onto Suffren's ships to increase his gunnery complement. His fleet weighed anchor on 18 June, and the two fleets began maneuvering for advantage.

Battle

Both fleets were at first frustrated by light and variable winds. When a consistent west wind developed on 20 June, Hughes lined-up for battle on a northward-trending port tack and awaited Suffren's action. Lining-up in a similar formation, Suffren gave to the order to attack, and battle was engaged shortly after four in the afternoon. The action lasted about three hours resulting in no major damage to ships in either fleet, despite all ships being engaged.

Aftermath
Suffren's fleet anchored about 25 nautical miles north of Cuddalore after the battle, while Hughes anchored near the city. On 22 June, Hughes sighted the French fleet while he was en route to Madras; a number of his ships had been disabled, and he reported that many men were suffering from scurvy and that he was short of water.

Suffren returned to Cuddalore on 23 June, forcing the British supply fleet to withdraw. In addition to returning the 1,200 troops he had borrowed from the city's garrison, he landed an additional 2,400 men to support the defense. A sortie from the city was repelled but weakened the besieging British, and on 29 June a British ship flying under a truce flag brought news of a preliminary peace agreement between the two nations, resulting in a mutually-agreed suspension of hostilities on 2 July.

Order of battle

Citations and references
Citations

References
 
 
 
 
 
  (1671-1870)

External links 
 

Naval battles of the East Indies Campaign
Naval battles involving France
Naval battles involving Great Britain
Conflicts in 1783
1783 in India